Cisliano (  or Sisian ) is a comune (municipality) in the Metropolitan City of Milan in the Italian region of Lombardy, located about  west of Milan.

Cisliano borders the following municipalities: Sedriano, Bareggio, Vittuone, Corbetta, Cusago, Albairate, and Gaggiano.

References

External links
 Official website

Cities and towns in Lombardy